The Chairman of the Presidium of the Supreme Soviet of the Georgian Soviet Socialist Republic was the nominal head of state of Soviet Georgia, which existed between 25 February 1921 and 9 April 1991. It succeeded the office of Chairman of the All-Georgian Central Executive Committee. Below is a table of the Chairmen of the Presidium of the Supreme Soviet of the Georgian SSR.

 

On 14 November 1990 the Presidium of the Supreme Soviet was abolished. The position of head of state went to the Chairman of the Supreme Council of Georgia, Zviad Gamsakhurdia.

Sources
World Statesmen.org: Georgia

.Supreme Soviet Chairmen
.Supreme Soviet Chairmen
.Supreme Soviet Chairmen
Politics of Georgia (country)
Georgian SSR